Rudbar Rural District may refer to:
 Rudbar Rural District (Hormozgan Province)
 Rudbar Rural District (Kerman Province)
 Rudbar Rural District (Markazi Province)
 Rudbar Rural District (Semnan Province)
 Rudbar Rural District (Ilam Province)